Félix Alexandre Andrade Sanches Correia (born 22 January 2001) is a Portuguese professional footballer of Bissau Guinean descent, who plays as a forward for Marítimo on loan from  club Juventus.

Club career

Manchester City 
Manchester City loaned Correia to Jong AZ for the 2019–20 season. On 23 August 2019, he made his Eerste Divisie debut for Jong AZ against TOP Oss. Correia ended the season with 23 appearances, scoring three goals and providing five assists.

Juventus U23 
On 30 June 2020, Juventus agreed to sign Correia on a five-year deal, on a swap deal with Pablo Moreno heading the other way. Correia scored his first goal and made his first assist for Juventus U23 on his Serie C debut, on 28 September 2020, against Pro Sesto, helping his side win 2–1.

Juventus

Senior debut 
Correia was first called-up for the first team on 13 January 2021, in a Coppa Italia game against Genoa. He made his senior debut on 2 May, coming off the bench for Juan Cuadrado in the 83rd minute in a 2–1 league win against Udinese.

Loan to Parma 
On 13 August 2021, Correia was loaned to Serie B side Parma with an option to buy. On 12 September, Correia debutted for Parma in a 4–0 win against Pordenone.

Loan to Marítimo 
On 31 January 2023, Correia was loaned by Marítimo for the rest of the season.

References

External links
 

2001 births
Living people
Portuguese footballers
Association football forwards
Manchester City F.C. players
Jong AZ players
Juventus Next Gen players
Juventus F.C. players
Parma Calcio 1913 players
C.S. Marítimo players
Eerste Divisie players
Serie A players
Serie B players
Serie C players
Portuguese expatriate footballers
Expatriate footballers in England
Expatriate footballers in the Netherlands
Expatriate footballers in Italy
Portuguese expatriate sportspeople in England
Portuguese expatriate sportspeople in the Netherlands
Portuguese expatriate sportspeople in Italy
Footballers from Lisbon